The 2004 Copa Libertadores Final was a two-legged football match-up to determine the 2004 Copa Libertadores champion. It was contested by Colombian club Once Caldas and Argentine club Boca Juniors. The first leg of the tie was played on 23 June at Boca Juniors' venue, La Bombonera, with the second leg played on 1 July at Estadio Palogrande in Manizales.

After both matches ended tied, Once Caldas won the series by penalty shoot-out.

Qualified teams

Venues

Route to the finals

Final summary

First leg

|

|}

Second leg

|

|}

References

l
l
2004
l
l
2004
l